Rubén González may refer to:

Arts and Entertainment
Rubén González (pianist) (1919–2003), Cuban pianist
Rubén González (album), the first album by Cuban pianist Rubén González
Introducing...Rubén González, the second album by the Cuban pianist

Politics
Rubén González Cárdenas (1875–1939), Venezuelan politician

Religion
Rubén González Medina (born 1949), bishop for the Roman Catholic Diocese of Caguas, Puerto Rico

Sports

Association football
Rubén González (Chilean footballer) (born 1927), Chilean football
Rubén González (Uruguayan footballer) (born 1939), Uruguayan football defender
Rubén González (footballer, born 1982), Spanish football centre-back
Rubén González (footballer, born 1994), Spanish football centre-back

Other sports
Rubén González (luger) (born 1962), Argentine luger
Ruben Gonzales (tennis) (born 1985), Filipino tennis player